Tempest 3000 is a remake of the 1981 Tempest arcade game released exclusively for the Nuon on December 12, 2000. Written by Jeff Minter, it is an enhanced version of Minter's own earlier Tempest 2000 (1994) for the Atari Jaguar. By 2003, the game had sold over 20,000 copies.

Gameplay
Tempest 3000 includes all of the enhancements from Tempest 2000 plus additional web designs, webs that move and reform, a greater game role for the jump control, a missile fire option (which attacks enemies in two columns of the web, but not the column in which the player's Claw is placed, thus providing no protection against oncoming enemies), and new bonus rounds.

References

2000 video games
DVD interactive technology
Fixed shooters
Llamasoft games
Video games developed in the United Kingdom